Carsten Körber (born 11 June 1979) is a German politician of the Christian Democratic Union (CDU) who has been serving as a member of the Bundestag from the state of Saxony since 2013.

Political career 
Körber first became member of the Bundestag in the 2013 German federal election. He is a member of the Budget Committee and the Audit Committee. In this capacity, he serves as his parliamentary group's rapporteur on the annual budgets of the Federal Ministry for Economic Cooperation and Development, the Federal Constitutional Court and the Federal Foreign Office (since 2022).

In March 2021, Körber replaced Axel Fischer as chair of the Audit Committee.

Other activities 
 German Corporation for International Cooperation (GIZ), Member of the Supervisory Board (since 2018)

References

External links 

  
 Bundestag biography 

1979 births
Living people
Members of the Bundestag for Saxony
Members of the Bundestag 2021–2025
Members of the Bundestag 2017–2021
Members of the Bundestag 2013–2017
Members of the Bundestag for the Christian Democratic Union of Germany